The Guanyinyan Dam is a gravity dam on the Jinsha River  southwest of Panzhihua on the border of Yunnan and Sichuan Provinces in China. The purpose of the dam is hydroelectric power generation and flood control. Construction on the dam started in 2008 and the river was diverted by 2010. The first generator was operational on 20 December 2014 and the fourth on 14 December 2015. The entire power station should be operational by 2016. When complete, the dam will support a 3,000 MW power station consisting of five 600 MW Francis turbine generators.

Design
A spillway and two discharge openings are also included in the design.

See also 

 List of power stations in China

References

Hydroelectric power stations in Yunnan
Hydroelectric power stations in Sichuan
Dams in China
Dams on the Jinsha River
Roller-compacted concrete dams
Dams completed in 2014
2014 establishments in China
Buildings and structures in Lijiang